This is a list of lakes located in Kosovo's Šar Mountains.

List

See also 
 Geography of Kosovo
 List of lakes in Kosovo

Notes

References 

Šar Mountains
Sar
Sar Mountains